These are the official results of the Women's 5000 metres at the 1996 Summer Olympics in Atlanta, Georgia, United States. There were a total of 48 competitors from 35 countries. The women's event was increased from 3000 meters in 1992 to 5000 meters in 1996 to match it with men's 5000 meters.

Results

Heats
Qualification: First 4 in each heat (Q) and the next 3 fastest (q) qualified to the final.

Final

See also
 1992 Women's Olympic 3,000 metres (Barcelona)
 1993 Women's World Championships 3,000 metres (Stuttgart)
 1994 Women's European Championships 3,000 metres (Helsinki)
 1995 Women's World Championships 5,000 metres (Gothenburg)
 1997 Women's World Championships 5,000 metres (Athens)
 1998 Women's European Championships 5,000 metres (Budapest)
 1999 Women's World Championships 5,000 metres (Seville)
 2000 Women's Olympic 5,000 metres (Sydney)

References

External links
 Official Report
 Results

5
5000 metres at the Olympics
1996 in women's athletics
Women's events at the 1996 Summer Olympics